Ezhupunna Tharakan is a 1999 Malayalam film directed by P. G. Viswambharan. It features Mammootty, Jagadish, Madhu and Namrata Shirodkar in the lead roles. This was Shirodkar's first & only Malayalam film. The film was a commercial falure.

Cast 

 Mammootty as Ezhupunna Sunny Tharakan
 Jagadish as Muhammad Ali
 Madhu as Ezhupunna Outha Tharakan 
 Namrata Shirodkar as Ashwathy Varma
 Sangeetha as Aiswarya Gowda
 Captain Raju as Ezhupunna Chacko Tharakan 
 K.P.A.C. Sunny as Ezhupunna Mathew Tharakan
 Rajan P. Dev as Kumbanadan Lazar 	
 Vijayakumar as Ezhupunna Baby Tharakan
 Kaviyoor Ponnamma as Kunjannamma 
 Praveena as Rani
 Zainuddin as Pushkaran
 Kozhikode Narayanan Nair as Paliyekkara Thampuran
 V. K. Sreeraman as Ramabhadran
 T. P. Madhavan as Justice Mahadevan 
 Jagannatha Varma as Father Bernard
 Spadikam George as Padmanabhan
 Rizabawa as DYSP Gopinathan Varma
 Chandni Shaju as Leena Lazer
 Manka Mahesh as Mary Chacko
Prof. Aliyar as Adv. Vasudevan Nair
Vimal Raj in cameo appearance
Shammi Thilakan in cameo appearance
 Bindu Ramakrishnan in cameo appearance
 Jayabharathi in cameo appearance

Songs 
The movie has 5 songs which were composed by Vidyasagar. The lyrics were written by Gireesh Puthenchery.

References

External links 
 
 https://archive.today/20130218004718/http://popcorn.oneindia.in/title/5352/ezhupunna-tharakan.html

1999 films
1990s Malayalam-language films
Films scored by Vidyasagar
Films directed by P. G. Viswambharan